The 2018 Wokingham Borough Council election took place on Thursday 3 May 2018. That was the same day as other United Kingdom local elections in order to elect members of Wokingham Unitary Council in Berkshire, England. One third of the council was up for election and the Conservative Party stayed comfortably in overall control of the council.

After the election, the composition of the council was:
Conservative 42
Liberal Democrat 8
Labour 3
Independent 1

Background
A total of 60 candidates contested the 18 seats which were up for election.

Issues in the election included:
Some recent controversial planning applications
Wokingham Town Centre Regeneration

Since the last round of elections, there had been 1 by-election in Emmbrook in 2017, which was won by the Liberal Democrats. Also, 2 Councillors had left the Conservatives, with one joining the Liberal Democrats and one standing as an Independent.

Election result
The Conservatives retained control of the council. The Liberal Democrats held two out of the three seats they defended, retaining their seats in Emmbrook and Winnersh, but lost a seat in South Lake to the Conservatives. The Liberal Democrats gained 2 seats in both Hawkedon and Evendons. Labour gained 2 seats in Bulmershe and Whitegates & Norreys. The Conservatives gained 1 seat in South Lake, but lost 4 seats in Evendons, Norreys, Bulmershe & Whitegates and Hawkedon. 1 seat was held by an Independent.

There were a total of 40,551 votes cast, including 120 spoiled ballots.

Ward results

References

2018 English local elections
2018
2010s in Berkshire